"Chasing Highs" is a song performed by Finnish singer-songwriter Alma. The song was released in Finland as a digital download on 23 March 2017 through PME Records. The song peaked at number 10 on the Finnish Singles Chart. The song was written by Henrik Meinke, Jonas Kalisch, Ned Siuipys, Pascal Reinhardt, Alma Miettinen, Jeremy Chacon and Alexsej Vlasenko.

Music video
A music video to accompany the release of "Chasing Highs" was first released onto YouTube on 31 March 2017 at a total length of three minutes and twenty-nine seconds. As of July 2022, the song has received 57 million views on YouTube.

Track listing

Charts

Weekly charts

Year-end charts

Certifications

Release history

References

2017 songs
2017 singles
Alma (Finnish singer) songs
Songs written by Jeremy Chacon
Songs written by Alma (Finnish singer)
Virgin Records